The Shanghai French Concession was a foreign concession in Shanghai, China from 1849 until 1943, which progressively expanded in the late 19th and early 20th centuries. The concession came to an end in 1943, when Vichy France under German pressure signed it over to the pro-Japanese Reorganized National Government of China in Nanjing. For much of the 20th century, the area covered by the former French Concession remained the premier residential and retail district of Shanghai, and was also one of the centres of Catholicism in China. Despite re-development over the last few decades, the area retains a distinct character and is a popular tourist destination.

History

Establishment
The French Concession was established on 6 April 1849, when the French Consul in Shanghai, Charles de Montigny, obtained a proclamation from Lin Kouei (麟桂, Lin Gui), the Circuit Intendant (Tao-tai/Daotai, effectively governor) of Shanghai, which conceded certain territory for a French settlement. The extent of the French Concession at the time of establishment extended south to the Old City's moat, north to the Yangjingbang canal (Yang-king-pang, now Yan'an Road), west to the Temple of Guan Yu (Koan-ti-miao, 关帝庙) and the Zhujia Bridge (Tchou-kia-kiao, 褚家桥), and east to the banks of the Huangpu River between the Guangdong-Chaozhou Union (Koang'tong-Tchao-tcheou kong-hoan) and the mouth of the Yangjingbang canal. The French Concession effectively occupied a narrow "collar" of land around the northern end of the Old City, south of the British settlement. At an area of 66 hectares (986 mu), the French Concession was about a third of the size of the British settlement at that time. A further small strip of riverside land to the east of the Old City was added in 1861, to allow the construction of the quai de France, to service shipping between China and France.

Rise and Fall

The French Concession's first significant expansion was agreed in 1899 and proclaimed in 1900, allowing the French Concession to double in size. The area newly added to the concession sat immediately to the west of the original grant.

In 1902, the French introduced from France London planes (le platane commun) as a roadside tree on Avenue Joffre (present-day Huaihai Road). Now popular as a roadside tree throughout China, because of its history it is known in Chinese as the "French plane".

Meanwhile, from 1860s, the French Concession authorities (like the other concession authorities) had begun constructing "extra-settlement roads" outside the concession. The first such road was built to connect the west gate of the Old City to the Catholic stronghold at Zi-ka-wei (Xujiahui), to allow French troops to quickly move between the concession and the Catholic Church land located in the area. Controlled by concession authorities, extra-settlement roads effectively gave France and the other treaty powers a form of control over land extending outside their formal concessions. In 1913, France requested police powers over its extra-settlement roads, effectively meaning a further expansion to the concession. The government of Yuan Shikai agreed, giving France police and taxation powers over the so-called extra-settlement roads area, in return for France agreeing to evict revolutionaries from the area under its jurisdiction. This agreement proclaimed in 1914, gave the French Concession control over a significantly larger area between the Old City and Xujiahui, 15 times the size of the original grant. As a nod to the more numerous Chinese residents in the new territory, two seats were given to Chinese members on the Administration Council. Encouraged by the successful expansion by the French, the Shanghai International Settlement also requested the grant of administrative powers over its own extra-settlement roads area in 1914, but this was refused.

By the 1920s, the French Concession was developed into the premier residential area of Shanghai. In particular, the expansive and initially sparsely populated "New French Concession" obtained under the second expansion of 1914 became popular for foreign nationals of all nationalities, and later well-to-do Chinese residents as well, to build houses on larger plots of land than they could obtain in the more crowded original concessions. As demand grew, numerous apartment buildings at varying levels of luxury were built, as well as some shikumen residences to meet demand from the increasing number of Chinese residents. Vibrant commercial areas also developed, helped by the influx of White Russians after the Russian Revolution.

Beginning of the end 
During the Battle of Shanghai, the Chinese bombed the concession twice by mistake and killed several hundred people.

When the Japanese took Shanghai in battle, their troops crossed the International Settlement unopposed, but at the entrance of the French Concession, Vice Admiral Jules Le Bigot, then commanding the Naval Forces in the Far East, sat on a folding chair in the middle of the street in front of their vehicles and forced them to negotiate to finally let only an unarmed supply convoy pass. On 4 December 1937, Japanese unarmed convoys were allowed to cross the concession.

As early as 1941, the occupation of Shanghai by the troops of the Japanese Empire forced tens of thousands of Chinese to take refuge in the concessions. The Bataillon mixte d'Infanterie coloniale de Chine (BMICC), many of whose troops were Annamese (Vietnamese), provided security.

Demise and legacy

In 1943, during World War II, the government of Vichy France announced that it would give up its concessions in Tianjin, Hankou and Guangzhou. These were handed over to the Wang Jingwei Government on 5 June 1943, with the Shanghai Concession following on 30 July. After the war, neither Vichy France nor Wang's Nationalist Government were universally recognised as legitimate, but the new post-war government of France acknowledged that it was a fait accompli in the Sino-French Accord of February 1946. This accord, signed by Chiang Kai-shek's ruling Kuomintang led to Chinese troops pulling out of the northern half of French Indochina in exchange for France relinquishing all its foreign concessions in China including Kouang-Tchéou-Wan.

The former French Concession remained largely unchanged during the early decades of Communist rule in China. In the late 1980s and the early 1990s, however, largely unregulated re-development of the area tore apart many old neighbourhoods. For example, the London planes on the former Avenue Joffre were removed in the 1990s, only to be later replaced after public outcry. The old French Club building and its gardens, which used to be a sports field in the early days, were removed and became the base of the high-rise Okura Garden Hotel.

After the 2000s, the government enforced more stringent development and planning controls in this area.

Extent 

From 1914 until its abolition, the French Concession covered the north-eastern part of today's Xuhui District and the western part of Huangpu District (the former Luwan District), occupying the centre, south, and west of urban Shanghai. A small strip extended eastward along the rue du Consulat, now the East Jinling Road, to the Quai de France, now East-2 Zhongshan Road, which runs along the Huangpu River to the south of the Bund.

To the south-east of the French Concession was the walled Chinese city. To the north was the British concession, later part of the Shanghai International Settlement. The British and French quarters were separated by several canals: in the east, this was "Yangjingbang", a creek flowing into the Huangpu River. These canals were later filled in and became Avenue Edward VII in the east and Avenue Foch in the west, both now part of Yan'an Road. To the south, the French Concession was bounded by the Zhaojiabang canal (now filled in as Zhaojiabang Road and Xujiahui Road).

Governance 

The chief French official in charge of the French Concession was the Consul-General of France in Shanghai. While the French initially participated in the Municipal Council of the International Settlement, in 1862 a decision was made to exit the Municipal Council to preserve the French Concession's independence. From then on, a day-to-day governance was carried out by the Municipal Administrative Council (conseil d'administration municipale). The council's offices were originally on rue du Consulat, the "high street" or rue principale of the original concession. In 1909, a new building was completed on Avenue Joffre. This building is now part of a shopping centre.

Security in the Concession was maintained by the French Concession Police or La Garde municipale de la Concession française. Just as the British employed many Indian police in the International Settlement, the French deployed many personnel from its nearby colony of Annam. A militia, the corps de volontaires, was first raised in the 1850s to protect the Concession during the Taiping Rebellion. From 1915 a battalion of Tirailleurs Tonkinese (colonial infantry) from French Indo China provided a military garrison for the French Concession.

As a treaty power which had been granted extraterritorial jurisdiction, France exercised consular jurisdiction in the French Concession. Cases involving French nationals were heard by the French consular court. Matters involving Chinese nationals, or nationals of non-treaty powers, were heard in the International Mixed Court for the French Concession, a court nominally headed by a Chinese official but "assisted" by French consular officials, and using an adapted version of Chinese procedural rules. The International Mixed Court was abolished in 1930 and replaced by Chinese courts under the judicial system of the Republic of China.

The French consulate also has the French Consular Police under its command.

Demography 

While the French Concession began as a settlement for the French, it soon attracted residents of various nationalities.

In the 1920s, with the expansion of the French Concession, British and American merchants who worked in the International Settlement often chose to build more spacious houses in the newer part of the French Concession. One legacy of this Anglophone presence is the American College on Avenue Pétain (now Hengshan Road), and the nearby Community Church.

Shanghai saw a large influx of Russian émigrés in the wake of the 1917 Russian Revolution. This raised the Russian population in the French Concession from 41 in 1915 to 7,000. This number increased to 8,260 by 1934 after the Japanese occupation of northeast China, where many Russians worked on the Chinese Eastern Railway. Two Russian Orthodox churches can still be seen in the former French Concession. The Russian community had a large presence on commercial streets such as Avenue Joffre and contributed to the development of the music profession in Shanghai.

The Chinese population in the French Concession swelled during the Taiping Rebellion, reaching about 500,000 just before the start of the Second Sino-Japanese War. During World War II, Japanese forces initially occupied only the Chinese areas, leaving the foreign concessions alone. Residents of the Chinese areas moved into the French Concession in large numbers, reaching 825,342.

Localities 

 Lokawei, "Lu's Bay", an area named after a bend on the Zhaojiabang creek. The main police depot and prison of the French concession was located here. Former Luwan District, today part of Huangpu District, was named after this locality. Since the 1990s, this area has seen high volume residential developments.
 Zikawei ("Xu's Confluence", or "Xujiahui" in Mandarin), an area named after the family of Xu Guangqi and the confluence of two local rivers. While Xujiahui was technically not part of the French Concession (lying immediately west of the boundary of the concession), it was the center of Catholic Shanghai, featuring St Ignatius Cathedral, the Observatory, the Library, and several colleges, all of which were French-dominated. Today, Xujiahui is a busy commercial district. Today's Xuhui District is named after this locality.
 Avenue Joffre, now Central Huaihai Road, was a boulevard stretching across the French Concession in an east–west direction. The road was renamed after Joseph Joffre in 1916, with the new name unveiled by the marshal himself in 1922. Avenue Joffre was a tram route. Its eastern section featured Shikumen residences. Its western part featured high-end residential developments, including standalone houses and apartment blocks. The central section was – and is – a popular shopping area, with many shops opened by the Russian community. The former Avenue Joffre remains a high-end retail district.
 Avenue Pétain, now Hengshan Road, was a major boulevard linking Xujiahui with the centre of the French Concession. It represented the centre of the French Concession's high-end residential district and featured many mansions and expensive apartment buildings. Beginning in the 1990s, some of the former houses had been converted into bars and nightclubs. Although some bars remain, recent years have seen the street become more residential.

Historical buildings in the French Concession

See also 

 Concessions in China
 French colonial empire
 List of French possessions and colonies
 Old City of Shanghai
 Shanghai International Settlement
 American Concession in Shanghai

References

Notes

Citations

Sources 

 Le Paris de l'Orient – Présence française à Shanghai, 1849–1946, ministère des Affaires étrangères français.

Further reading 
 Maybon, Ch. B (1929) Histoire de la Concession Française de Changhai, Paris: Librairie Plon

External links

 Xuhui District government portal

1849 establishments in China
1849 establishments in the French colonial empire
1943 disestablishments
1943 disestablishments in China
Concessions in China
European colonisation in Asia
French colonial architecture
French colonial empire
French concession
French concession
French concession
Xuhui District